Tyson Larson (born April 16, 1986) is an American politician who served as a member of the Nebraska Legislature for the 40th district from 2011 to 2019. 

Early life and education

Larson was born in Fort Carson, Colorado. He graduated from Weeping Water High School in Weeping Water, Nebraska, in 2004. He earned a Bachelor of Arts degree in government and theology from Georgetown University in 2008.

Career
In 2010 Larson defeated 20-year incumbent Senator Cap Dierks and was elected to represent the 40th Nebraska legislative district.

During his first two years in the Legislature, Larson sat on the Agriculture, Enrollment and Review (Chairman), General Affairs, Judiciary, and State-Tribal Relations committees. During his third and fourth years in the Legislature, he helped to develop and coordinate the state's $8.5 billion budget on the Appropriations committee.

In 2014, Larson ran for re-election, defeating challenger Keith Kube with over 67% of the vote. Upon returning to the Legislature, Larson was elected to be Chairman of the General Affairs committee and served on the Agriculture and Government committees. Larson was also selected by his colleagues to serve on the Legislature's Executive Board.

References

 

1986 births
Living people
People from O'Neill, Nebraska
Republican Party Nebraska state senators
Georgetown University alumni
21st-century American politicians
People from Cass County, Nebraska
People from El Paso County, Colorado